John Paul Fruttero (born April 30, 1981) is an American professional tennis player. He competes mainly on the ATP Challenger Tour and ITF Futures, both in singles and doubles. He reached his highest ATP singles ranking, No. 183 on November 21, 2005, and his highest ATP doubles ranking, No. 83, on May 7, 2012.

JP (as he is more commonly known by) has won 3 singles titles and 18 doubles titles on the ATP Challenger and ITF Futures tours.

He prefers playing on hard courts, and uses a Babolat tennis racket.

ATP Challenger and ITF Futures finals

Singles: 6 (3–3)

Doubles: 41 (18–23)

References

External links

1981 births
Living people
American male tennis players
Sportspeople from Berkeley, California
Sportspeople from Montebello, California
Tennis people from California
California Golden Bears men's tennis players
American people of Italian descent
Doping cases in tennis